254 (East of England) Medical Regiment, Royal Army Medical Corps, is a regiment of the British Army Reserve. The regiment, based in East Anglia, is part of the Army Medical Services (AMS) and specialises in providing pre-hospital care.

History 
The regiment was formed in Cambridge in 1983 as 254th (City of Cambridge) Field Ambulance, RAMC (Volunteers). In 1999 it was re-organised with detachments at Norwich, Hitchin and Cambridge. It became 254th (City of Cambridge) Divisional General Support Medical Regiment, RAMC (Volunteers) in 2006. By then it was based at Cherry Hinton and had detachments at Norwich, Hitchin and Colchester.

Under the Future Soldier programme, the regiment will be redesignated as the 254th (East of England) Multi-Role Medical Regiment by January 2024.  The regiment will come under 2nd Medical Group.

Role 
The Regiment's role is to train and provide officers and soldiers to support the Regular Army at home and abroad on military operations. The regiment specialises in providing pre-hospital medicine. The regiment recruits combat medical technicians, doctors, nurses, paramedics, drivers, chefs and military clerks from all walks of life and trains all individuals to the high standards required by the Army.

Structure 
The Regiment has sub-units at the following locations:

 Regimental Headquarters, Army Reserve Centre, Cherry Hinton Road, Cambridge
 161 Medical Squadron, Army Reserve Centre, Circular Road East, Colchester
 162 Medical Squadron, Army Reserve Centre, Bedford Road, Hitchin
 163 Support Squadron, Army Reserve Centre,  Cherry Hinton Road, Cambridge

References

External links 
 Official website

Military units and formations established in 1983
Units of the Royal Army Medical Corps
Army Reserve (United Kingdom)
1983 establishments in England